Greggs Creek is a stream in western Howard County in the U.S. state of Missouri. It is a tributary to the Missouri River.

Greggs Creek was named for the original owner of the land along its course.

See also
List of rivers of Missouri

References

Rivers of Howard County, Missouri
Rivers of Missouri